The 2023 KNSB Dutch Sprint Championships in speed skating were held in Heerenveen at the Thialf ice skating rink from 27 December to 28 December 2022. The tournament was part of the 2022–2023 speed skating season. Hein Otterspeer and Jutta Leerdam won the sprint titles. The sprint championships were held on the same day as the 2023 KNSB Dutch Allround Championships.

Schedule

Medalists

Men's sprint classification

 DNF = Did not finish

Women's sprint classification

source:

References

KNSB Dutch Sprint Championships
KNSB Dutch Sprint Championships
2023 Sprint